Christian Novoa Sandin (born 9 July 1991), simply known as Christian Novoa is a Venezuelan footballer who plays for Monagas as a forward.

Club career
In Venezuela, Novoa played for Caracas between 2010 and 2014 and was loaned to various clubs. He spent the 2013–14 on loan at Carabobo and subsequently scored 10 goals for the club in 30 appearances. On 26 May 2014, he signed for Doxa Katokopias in Cypriot First Division. On 12 August 2019, he signed with the Indy Eleven of the USL Championship .

References

External links

1991 births
Living people
Association football forwards
Venezuelan footballers
Caracas FC players
Yaracuyanos FC players
Carabobo F.C. players
Doxa Katokopias FC players
Metropolitanos FC players
Venezuelan Primera División players
Cypriot First Division players
Venezuelan expatriate footballers
Expatriate footballers in Cyprus
Venezuelan expatriate sportspeople in Cyprus
Indy Eleven players
USL Championship players
21st-century Venezuelan people